Elias Legarde (a/k/a Legardo) b. abt 1593 in Languedoc, France, d. abt 1670 in Elizabeth City, Virginia, was a Sephardic Jew who arrived at James City, Virginia, on HMS Abigail in 1621.  Legarde arrived in the muster, the equivalent of an indentured servant, of Anthonie Bonall.

According to Leon Huhner, Elias was from Languedoc, France, and was hired to go to the colony to teach people how to grow grapes for wine.

Elias Legarde was living in Buckroe in Elizabeth City, Virginia, in February 1624. Elias was employed by Anthonie Bonall, age 46, who arrived on the same ship as Elias. Anthonie Bonall was a French silk maker and vigneron (someone who cultivates vineyards for winemaking), one of the men from Languedoc sent to the colony by John Bonall, keeper of the silkworms of King James I.

In 1628 Elias leased 100 acres on the west side of Harris Creek in Elizabeth City.

See also
 Colonial history of the United States
 History of the Jews in the United States
 History of the Jews in Colonial America

Notes and references

Jewish-American history
1590s births
1620s deaths
People from Languedoc-Roussillon
French emigrants to the Thirteen Colonies
17th-century French Sephardi Jews
17th-century  American Sephardic Jews